Anisynta sphenosema, the wedge grass-skipper or wedge skipper, is a species of butterfly of the family Hesperiidae. It is found in the south-west quarter of Australia.

The wingspan is about 30 mm.

The larvae feed on various grasses, including Microlaena stipoides, Ehrharta calycina and Ehrharta longiflora.

External links
 Australian Caterpillars

Trapezitinae
Butterflies described in 1902